Limboto is a town in Indonesia and the administrative centre of Gorontalo Regency.

References

Populated places in Gorontalo (province)
Regency seats of Gorontalo